Llanito or Yanito is a form of Andalusian Spanish heavily laced with words from English and other languages, such as Ligurian; it is spoken in the British overseas territory of Gibraltar. It is commonly marked by a great deal of code switching between Andalusian Spanish and British English and by the use of Anglicisms and loanwords from other Mediterranean languages and dialects.

The English language is becoming increasingly dominant in Gibraltar, with the younger generation speaking little or no Llanito despite learning Spanish in school.

Llanito is a Spanish word meaning "little plain". Gibraltarians also call themselves Llanitos.

Etymology
The etymology of the term  is uncertain. In Spanish,  means "little flatland" and has been interpreted as "people of the flatlands". It is thought that the inhabitants of La Línea with important social and economic ties with Gibraltar, were actually the first to be referred to as  since La Línea lies in the plain and marsh land surrounding The Rock.

Another theory for the origin of the word is that it is a diminutive of the name : "gianito", pronounced in Genoese slang with the "g" as "j". To this day, nearly 20% of Gibraltarian surnames are Italian in origin.

History
The most influential periods for the formation of Llanito are:
 1713. The Treaty of Utrecht yields Gibraltar to the United Kingdom.
 After the Spanish War of Independence and the Peninsular War, British authorities form an education system of British inspiration.
 During the evacuation of Gibraltar within the Second World War, the authorities realise that most of the Gibraltarians lack a sufficient command of English. Subsequently, Spanish is relegated to a foreign language subject in the education system.
 1969–1982. Spanish governments close "the fence" (the land border) and Spanish workers cannot cross the border into Gibraltar. This reduced the need for Spanish in the workplace and the input of Spanish nannies.

Language
Andalusian Spanish from the surrounding Campo de Gibraltar is the main constituent of Llanito, but it is also heavily influenced by British English. However, it borrows words and expressions of many other languages, with over 500 words of Genoese (Ligurian) medieval dialect (with additionally some of Hebrew origin via Judaeo-Spanish). Its other main language constituents are Maltese and Portuguese.
It often also involves code-switching (using different languages for different sentences) and code mixing (using different languages for different words in the same sentence) from Spanish to English.
Caló borrowings have been lost.
Some Llanito words are also widely used in the neighbouring Spanish town of La Línea de la Concepción (due to the influx of people from La Línea working in Gibraltar over many years).

To some outsiders who speak either only English or only Spanish, Llanito may sound incomprehensible, as speakers appear to switch languages in mid-sentence, but to people who are bilingual in both languages, it can sound interesting and unique. One feature of the language is the pronunciation of Anglicisms with an Andalusian flavour. For example, "bacon" is pronounced ; "cake",  (although these particular words are not prevalent today); and porridge is called  (a hispanicisation of the brand Quaker Oats).
Most Gibraltarians, especially those with higher education, also speak standard Spanish with Andalusian pronunciations and standard English of a British English variety.
For example, "Gibraltar" may be pronounced in English within an English sentence and in Spanish within a Spanish sentence.

One difference from surrounding dialects is that Gibraltarians tend to maintain this high rate of reduction of final consonants even in very elevated registers, whereas Andalusians would try to adopt a more neutral pronunciation.
Llanito has undergone some degree of lexical restructuring as a result of its reduction of final consonants and the unofficial status of Spanish.

According to the Italian scholar Giulio Vignoli, Llanito originally, in the first decades of the 19th century, was full of Genoese words, later replaced by mainly Spanish and some English words.

Llanito has significant Jewish influence, because of a long-standing Jewish population in Gibraltar. They introduced words and expressions from Haketia, a largely extinct Judeo-Spanish language spoken by the Sephardic communities of Northern Morocco such as in Tetuan and Tangiers, and the Spanish exclaves of Ceuta and Melilla in North Africa.

Although Llanito is seldom written, a Llanito dictionary, was published in 1978 by Manuel Cavilla, and in 2001 Tito Vallejo published The Yanito Dictionary. Including Place Names and Yanito Anecdotes.

Core elements of Llanito vocabulary
Although Llanito is largely based on the colloquial Spanish spoken in the Campo de Gibraltar, there are numerous elements beyond code-switching to English which make it unique. These are as follows.

Anglicisms
They may be false friends or involve an informal playfulness.
: "watchman" or "guard". From English "Check Gate" influenced by the Basque surname Echegaray.
: Gibraltar border with Spain. From English "Four Corners".
In standard Spanish,  is a "defence speech".

Calques from English to Spanish
These expressions are meaningless in standard Spanish.
: Literal translation into Spanish of English phrase "I'll call you back". In standard Spanish, one would normally say "I'll return your call".
: "To give back". 
: "To come back".
: "To talk back".
: "To pay back".
Usage of  expressions is also widespread in US Spanish, including in Isleño Spanish.  expressions are unique as a calque of an English verbal particle, since other phrasal verbs are almost never calqued into Spanish. Because of this, and because  expressions are both consistent with Spanish structure and distinctly structured to their English equivalents, they are likely a result of a conceptual, not linguistic loan.

The word  in Llanito means  ("liquorice") in Spanish, stemming from the English "liquorice bar".

Calques from Spanish to English
: Literal translation of Spanish expression , meaning "stop annoying me".
 : This is a humorous expression based on the Spanish word  which means "" in British English. The end of the word, is how the word  (finger) is pronounced in colloquial Andalusian Spanish, thus .

Local expressions
 Literally, "Who do you think you are? The son of the Melbil?", as used when someone is acting with excessive self-importance.  is a Spanish approximation of the pronunciation of the British name Melville, and the expression is an allusion to Lord Melville, a British statesman prominent in the early 19-century, and his son. The elder Lord Melville was Secretary at War (1794–1801), and First Lord of the Admiralty (1804–1805); the younger Melville was also First Lord of the Admiralty from 1812 to 1827.

Llanito words introduced into Spain
Many Llanito terms have been introduced into the Andalusian Spanish dialect of the bordering city La Línea de la Concepción, where the resulting dialect is known as Linense. However, according to Gibraltarian linguist Tito Vallejo, a few words common throughout Spain may be of Llanito origin, notably  meaning "cool" or "brilliant" (from Winston Churchill) and  meaning "big nose" from the Governor Robert Napier, 1st Baron Napier of Magdala. Churchill was associated with foreign imports from the United Kingdom which were highly prized in Gibraltar and, according to Vallejo, Lord Napier had a particularly big nose.

However, linguists also propose  to be a contraction of the Caló term  meaning "truth", since this language is the source of a significant proportion of Spanish slang.

Broadcasting
The Gibraltar Broadcasting Corporation has broadcast some programmes in Llanito, including Talk About Town, a discussion series in which three presenters discuss local affairs, from the need to replace a street sign to important political affairs.

Pepe's Pot was a cookery programme which also used Llanito.

Film
A documentary film, People of the Rock: The Llanitos of Gibraltar (2011) discusses Llanito speech characteristics, history and culture. Notable interviews include Pepe Palmero (of GBC's Pepe's Pot), Kaiane Aldorino (Miss World 2009), and Tito Vallejo (author of The Llanito Dictionary).

Demonym
The people of Gibraltar tend to call themselves Gibraltarians in English, but the informal  when speaking Spanish.

The truncated term  is also used by the people of Gibraltar, and heard in Gibraltar National Day songs.

See also
 Diglossia
 Languages of Gibraltar
 Languages of the United Kingdom
 Spanglish

References

Sources

External links
 Llanito alphabet and pronunciation at Omniglot
  A searchable database of Gibraltarian sayings and street signs
 A weekly comical editorial in exaggerated code-switching Llanito by the daily Panorama (newspaper) 
 ‘Andalunglish’: the English words Spaniards have borrowed from Gibraltar, 31 October 2016, Nick Lyne, El País. Article about a collection of Anglicisms used in Campo de Gibraltar.

Dictionaries
 
 

Languages of Gibraltar
Spanish dialects
Macaronic forms of English
Mixed languages
Languages of the United Kingdom